The 1990 FIFA World Cup qualification UEFA Group 2 was a UEFA qualifying group for the 1990 FIFA World Cup. The group comprised Albania, England, Poland and Sweden.

The group was won by Sweden, who qualified for the 1990 FIFA World Cup. England also qualified as one of the best runners-up.

Standings

Results

Goalscorers
There were 26 goals scored during the 12 games, an average of 2.17 goals per game.

2 goals

 Sokol Kushta
 John Barnes
 Peter Beardsley
 Gary Lineker
 Ryszard Tarasiewicz
 Johnny Ekström

1 goal

 Ylli Shehu
 Paul Gascoigne
 Bryan Robson
 Chris Waddle
 Neil Webb
 Krzysztof Warzycha
 Jacek Ziober
 Leif Engqvist
 Hans Holmqvist
 Klas Ingesson
 Niclas Larsson
 Peter Larsson
 Roger Ljung
 Mats Magnusson

References

2
1988–89 in English football
qual
1988–89 in Albanian football
1989–90 in Albanian football
1988–89 in Polish football
1989–90 in Polish football
1988 in Swedish football
1989 in Swedish football